"Headlock" is a song by British singer-songwriter Imogen Heap, from her 2005 album Speak for Yourself. It was the third single from Speak for Yourself, following "Hide and Seek" and "Goodnight and Go". Remixed for radio as 'Immi's Radio mix' and accompanied by a new all-vocal B-side, entitled "Mic Check".

The video was filmed on 11 July 2006. The video premiered on Manchester-centric TV station, Channel M, in early September, before being sent to other music television channels for rotation.

The drum and bass artist High Contrast remixed the song. The artist Clams Casino also sampled the song in his song "The World Needs Change". Furthermore, the song was sampled in rapper A$AP Rocky's song "Angels", a bonus track from his debut album Long.Live.A$AP.

Featured instruments include mbira, string bass, and a vibraphone.

Track listings

CD single and 7" vinyl
 Headlock (Immi's radio mix) – 3:13
 Mic Check – 4:35

Promo vinyl & CD
 Headlock (Immi's radio edit) – 3:16
 Headlock (High Contrast remix) (edit) – 3:25

Charts

References

Imogen Heap songs
2006 songs
Songs written by Imogen Heap
Song recordings produced by Imogen Heap